The Melide causeway crosses across Lake Lugano in the Swiss canton of Ticino, connecting the communities of Melide and Bissone, and provides the only domestic land connection between the southern section of Ticino, around Mendrisio and Chiasso, and the rest of Switzerland.

Today the causeway carries the Gotthard railway, the A2 motorway, and a main road. A bridge within the causeway permits water flow and navigation between the two halves of Lake Lugano.

The causeway was designed by Pasquale Lucchini, a self-taught Ticinese civil engineer, who arranged for large quantities of rock to be dumped on top of the moraine to create the causeway. The causeway was built between 1841 and 1847, and opened for road traffic in 1848. The railway was added to the causeway in 1872, and the motorway in 1980.

References

External links

Buildings and structures in Ticino
Causeways in Europe
Lake Lugano
Railway bridges in Switzerland
Road bridges in Switzerland